Baek Ga-young (Korean: 백가영; born October 23, 1987), better known by her stage name Hello Ga-young (Korean: 안녕하신가영), is a South Korean singer-songwriter. Before beginning her solo project, she was a member of Joa Band, a Korean indie band, from 2009 to 2013. She debuted as a singer-songwriter in December 2013, with her first single "A Song of Old Lovers" (Korean: 우리 너무 오래 아꼈던 그 말). Her albums were released by her independent music label helloeumak (Korean: 안녕음악), before she established a partnership with Interpark Entertainment in 2017. Except for some soundtrack appearances, all of her songs released to date were written by herself. From 2013 to present, Hello Ga-young has released two albums, three extended plays, and seventeen singles.

Career

2009–2013: a bassist of Joa Band 
The musical career of Baek Ga-young began when she joined Joa Band as a bassist in 2009. Because Joa Band members would typically sing songs they wrote themselves, she began writing and singing her songs while in the band. Her first song in Joa Band was "Life Is Unpredictable (Hot Choco)" (Korean: 인생은 알 수가 없어(핫초코)). She composed and sang three more songs, "잘 지내니 좀 어떠니" (Literal meaning: "Are you doing all right?"), "길을 잃기 위해서" (Literal meaning: "For the purpose of getting lost"), and "A World Without Time" (Korean: 10분이 늦어 이별하는 세상). "잘 지내니 좀 어떠니", which was her first song to be introduced on a television show, "2 Days & 1 Night" of KBS2.

2013–2015: single debut, Those Moments 
In 2013, she started a small music label, helloeumak, with her friend Cheon See-woo (Korean: 천시우) as an A&R executive. Her debut single, "A Song of Old Lovers", was released on December 30, 2013. On March 20, 2014, her first extended play "Opponent Process Theory" (Korean: 반대과정이론) was released, including two singles "A Song of Old Lovers" and "Just Because I Like You" (Korean: 네가 좋아), and three more new songs: "I'm Coming to You" (Korean: 너에게 간다), "Opponent Process Theory", and "Dish" (Korean: 그릇).

In 2015, Hello Ga-young released her first album, "Those Moments" (Korean: 순간의 순간). The album ranked second within the first two weeks after the release at K-Indie Chart vol.48, a Korean independent music chart released twice a month by Mirrorball Music. Those Moments remained in the top 30 of the chart for 14 weeks (vol.48~vol.54, from February 11, 2015 to May 25, 2015).

2016–2018: Feelings, Collection Of Short Stories 
Her musical career began in 2016 with the release of the second extended play Feelings (Korean: 좋아하는 마음) on January 19. In March, she announced her one-year music project, Collection Of Short Stories (Korean: 단편집). The first single of the project was "Collection Of Short Stories – Winter To Spring" (Korean: 단편집 – 겨울에서 봄). Following the first single, "Collection Of Short Stories – Satellite" (Korean: 단편집 – 인공위성), "Collection Of Short Stories – Hang In There When You Feel Down" (Korean: 단편집 – 우울한 날들에 최선을 다해줘), and "Collection Of Short Stories – Where Is Love" (Korean: 단편집 – 어디에 있을까) were respectively released in summer, autumn, and winter. She also wrote and published her first essay, "Sleepless Summer Night", during the project. The book's title was inspired by her single "Sleepless Summer Night" (Korean: 언젠가 설명이 필요한 밤), previously released in 2014, and each chapter's title was inspired by the titles of four singles of Collection of Short Stories. The project ended as her third extended play, Collection Of Short Stories (Almost Like Missing You), was released on March 17, 2017, including the four Collections Of Short Stories singles as well as her new song "Almost Like Missing You" (Korean: 그리움에 가까운). The album ranked third at the K-Indie Chart vol.98. The chart has also noted that the album contains strong seasonal feelings.

2019–present: something special 
When her second album something special (Korean: 특별히 대단할 것) was released in 2019, she performed a solo concert celebrating the release at Ewha Girls' High School's 100th-Anniversary Hall, from February 16 to 17.

Discography

Studio albums

Extended plays

Single albums

Singles

Soundtrack appearances

Collaborations

Books

References 

Living people
1987 births
21st-century South Korean women singers
South Korean singer-songwriters
Musicians from Busan
South Korean women singer-songwriters